The Imperial Standards of Iran (Persian: پرچم‌های پادشاهی دودمان پهلوی) were the personal official flags of the Shāhanshāh, Shahbānū, and Crown Prince of Iran, adopted at the beginning of 1971.

The official flag of Shāhanshāh consisted of a pale-blue field with the flag of Iran in the upper left corner and the Pahlavi coat of arms in the centre. At the top of the coat of arms was the Pahlavi crown, created for the Coronation of Rezā Shāh in 1926. The Imperial motto of Pahlavi is "Mara dad farmud va Khod Davar Ast" ("Justice He bids me do, as He will judge me" or, alternatively, "He gave me power to command, and He is the judge").

Pale blue was the colour of the Imperial Family. The uniforms of the Imperial Guard included this colour to show their allegiance.

Historical

Qajar dynasty

Pahlavi dynasty

See also
 Emblem of Iran
 Flags of Iran
 Flags of the Mughal Empire
 Flags of the Ottoman Empire

References

External links
 Heraldic symbols of the members of the Pahlavi dynasty (Russian) - article in Heraldry Council under the President of the Russian Federation site

Iranian culture
Iran